The 2012–13 campaign was Huddersfield Town's first season back in the second tier of English football, since the 2000–01 season.

They qualified to play in the 2012–13 Football League Championship after they beat Sheffield United in the final at Wembley Stadium on 26 May 2012. After the match finished 0–0 after extra time, the Terriers won the penalty shoot-out 8–7, after every player on the pitch took a penalty. The decisive penalty was taken by the United goalkeeper Steve Simonsen, who saw his penalty go over the crossbar, giving Huddersfield the glory, and promotion to the Football League Championship.

This was meant to be Simon Grayson's first full season in charge of the Terriers, but instead he was sacked on 24 January 2013, following a run of 12 consecutive league games without a win. After Town legend Mark Lillis steadied the ship for 5 games, the Coventry City boss Mark Robins was appointed as the new manager on 14 February 2013.

Squad at the start of the season

Kit
The 2012/13 season was the club's second with technical kit supplier Umbro, and their first with home sponsor Rekorderlig Cider. Radian B continued their away shirt sponsorship. The Club introduced new home and away kits, and retained the away kit from the previous season as a third kit. Alternate shorts and socks were available for all outfield kits in the event of a colour clash, however in away games where the home kit could have theoretically been worn, the away kit was worn instead.

The home shirt is the club's traditional blue and white stripes but with a chequered pattern of light and darker blue within the stripes, and was worn for the first time in the pre-season friendly at Guiseley. It was worn with white shorts and black socks, except in the away games at Crystal Palace and Burnley, in which it was worn with white socks. The away shirt is dark navy with a broad white stripe across the shoulders and collar, and was worn for the first time in the pre-season friendly at Kilmarnock. The goalkeeper kits featured a striking geometric pattern across the front.

|
|
|
|
|
|
|
|
|

Review
Town made their first signing of the summer on 22 June, with the transfer of winger/striker Sean Scannell from Crystal Palace for an undisclosed fee. On 27 June, Scotland under-21 international defender Paul Dixon signed on a free transfer from Dundee United. Young midfielder Oliver Norwood signed from Manchester United on a 3-year-deal, beating Championship rivals Barnsley to his signature. On 6 July, Simon Grayson raided his former club Leeds United to sign Adam Clayton on an undisclosed fee, just 2 years after bringing him to Elland Road. On 11 July, Welsh defender Joel Lynch joined after being released by Nottingham Forest. On 26 July, Blackpool midfielder Keith Southern signed on a 2-year-deal, reuniting him with Simon Grayson, who managed him at Bloomfield Road. On 7 August, defender Anthony Gerrard was signed on a 3-year-deal from fellow Championship side Cardiff City in a deal believed to be worth £350,000. On 24 August, Norwich City striker James Vaughan joined the club on a season-long loan deal. As the transfer window shut on 31 August, Town signed winger Adam Hammill on loan from Wolverhampton Wanderers until January 2013. On 28 September, after being snubbed by the club on transfer deadline day, Jermaine Beckford joined on a 3-month loan deal from divisional rivals, Leicester City. On 8 November, Welsh international striker Simon Church joined on a month's loan from Premier League side Reading. He returned to Reading on 31 December after his extension expired. On 8 January 2013, Beckford's Leicester teammate, Neil Danns joined on loan for the remainder of the season. On 22 February, new manager Mark Robins brought back a familiar face to the Terriers, by signing recently capped Jamaican international Theo Robinson on loan from Derby County for the remainder of the season. On 11 April, Town signed striker Daniel Carr from non-league side Dulwich Hamlet for £100,000, which will see the striker join up with the Terriers once this season has concluded. On 26 April, Irish youngster Jake Carroll was signed from St Patrick's Athletic on an undisclosed fee, and like Carr, will join up with the Terriers after this season is concluded.

On 10 August, Antony Kay became the first departure of the season, when he left to sign a 2-year-deal at Milton Keynes Dons. The following day, defender Jamie McCombe had his contract terminated, which paved the way for a move to Doncaster Rovers. On 24 August, defender Liam Ridehalgh rejoined Chesterfield on a one-month loan deal. His teammate, Chris Atkinson joined him on 12 September. On 30 August, Town fans were left distraught after their prized possession, Jordan Rhodes was sold to their Championship rivals Blackburn Rovers for £8 million, a record selling fee for Town, as well as a record purchasing for Blackburn, and it was also the highest fee paid for a player between 2 non-Premier League clubs. Kallum Higginbotham joined Carlisle United on a 3-month loan deal on 20 September. On 16 October, young striker Jimmy Spencer joined Brentford on a month's loan. On 22 November, as the loan window shut, Ridehalgh was recalled from his loan at Chesterfield and sent on loan to their divisional rivals, Rotherham United. On 5 December, youngster Jordan Sinnott, joined Conference North side Altrincham (managed by his father and ex-Town player, Lee) on loan for a month. On 7 December, young duo Matt Crooks and James Burke joined Radcliffe Borough on a month's loan. Young strike duo Max Leonard and Connor Loftus were sent out on a month's loan to Garforth Town and Mossley on 21 December. Following his return from Carlisle, Kallum Higginbotham still found himself out of the picture at Huddersfield, so joined Scottish Premier League side Motherwell on loan for the rest of the season on 9 January. The following day, Jimmy Spencer went out on loan for the second time, joining Crawley Town for the remainder of the season, but he returned to Huddersfield on 6 February with a knee injury, making no appearances for the Red Devils. As the transfer window shut on 31 January, midfielder Anton Robinson joined League Two leaders Gillingham on loan for the rest of the season. However, he returned to the club on 11 April, after rupturing his anterior cruciate ligaments, which will rule him out of football for 9 months.

Squad at the end of the season

Transfers

In

Loans in

Out

Loans out

Statistics

Overview

League table

Results summary

Result round by round

Squad statistics

Appearances and goals

|}

Top scorers

Disciplinary record

Results

Pre-season

Championship

FA Cup

Football League Cup

Under 21s

U21 Professional Development League 2 North

Table

Knockout stage

Under 18s

U18 Professional Development League 2 North

Table

Knockout stage

FA Youth Cup

References

Huddersfield Town A.F.C. seasons
Huddersfield